Edson Lemaire (born 31 October 1990) is a Tahitian footballer who plays for AS Dragon and Tahiti national football team.

International career
Lemaire made his debut for the senior team during the 2012 OFC Nations Cup starting the match against Vanuatu as a right-back.

Honours

Domestic
OFC Nations Cup:
 Winner (1): 2012

International career statistics

References

External links

1990 births
Living people
French Polynesian footballers
Tahiti international footballers
2012 OFC Nations Cup players
2013 FIFA Confederations Cup players
Association football fullbacks